The 1919 Colorado Agricultural Aggies football team represented Colorado Agricultural College (now known as Colorado State University) in the Rocky Mountain Conference (RMC) during the 1919 college football season.  In their ninth season under head coach Harry W. Hughes, the Aggies compiled a 7–1 record and outscored all opponents by a total of 218 to 57.

Three Colorado Agricultural players received all-conference honors in 1919: fullback Harry Scott, halfback Duane Hartshorn, and tackle H.L. (Hap) Dotson.

Schedule

References

Colorado Agricultural
Colorado State Rams football seasons
Rocky Mountain Athletic Conference football champion seasons
Colorado Agricultural Aggies football